The Chaser is a 2012 South Korean television drama series about a grieving father out for revenge against corrupt officials.

Despite no hype or big stars, the thriller gave a strong performance in the ratings, ending its run at 22.1% (number one in its timeslot). Its rise in popularity was based on the tightly written and well-structured storyline, solid direction, and cast members' acting skills.

Plot
The series tells the story of Detective Baek Hong-suk, a happily married family man whose life is shattered when his 15-year-old daughter is killed in a car accident, causing his wife to go into a state of shock, eventually killing herself and leaving Hong-suk a widower. He later discovers his daughter's death was the result of a conspiracy led by politician Kang Dong-yoon, to secure his political future as a presidential candidate. Hong-suk goes from loving, doting father and cop to harrowed man hellbent on revenge, as Kang continues to rise in power. With the help of Kang's sister-in-law, a reporter, Hong-suk takes revenge against the man who ruined his life.

Cast

Main
Son Hyun-joo as Detective Baek Hong-suk
Kim Sang-joong as Presidential candidate Kang Dong-yoon

Supporting
Go Joon-hee as Reporter Seo Ji-won
Kim Sung-ryung as Seo Ji-soo
Ryu Seung-soo as Choi Jung-woo 
Park Hyo-joo as Detective Jo 
Kang Shin-il as Squad Chief Detective Hwang
Lee Yong-woo as PK Joon
Jang Shin-young as Shin Hye-ra 
Lee Hye-in as Baek Soo-jung (Hong-suk's and Mi-yeon's daughter)
Kim Do-yeon as Song Mi-yeon
Jo Jae-yoon as Park Yong-sik
Choi Joon-young as Yoon Chang-min
Lee Re as Yoon Chang-min's daughter
Park Geun-hyung as Company president Seo
Jeon No-min as Seo Young-wook
Nam Da-reum as Kang Min-sung
Jeon Gook-hwan as Jang Byung-ho
Song Jae-ho as Yoo Tae-jin
Ryohei Otani as Bae Sang-moo
Kim Min-ha as Hyo-jin

Special Appearance
 Lee Jung-gil as Jo Dong-soo
 Jung Soo-in as Choi's secretary
 Jo Young-jin as Kim Chang-jae

Original soundtracks

The Chaser OST

The Chaser OST Special

Ratings
 In the table below, the blue numbers represent the lowest ratings and the red numbers represent the highest ratings.
NR denotes that the drama did not rank in the top 20 daily programs on that date.

Awards and nominations

International broadcast
It aired in Japan on cable channel KNTV from 20 September – 8 November 2013, and was re-aired on cable channel BS-Fuji.

It aired in Thailand on Workpoint TV in midyear 2015.

References

External links
 The Chaser official SBS website 
 
 

2012 South Korean television series debuts
2012 South Korean television series endings
Seoul Broadcasting System television dramas
Korean-language television shows
South Korean action television series
South Korean thriller television series
Television series by Kim Jong-hak Production